Shirley Jones (born September 22, 1953) is an American R&B singer best known as a member and lead vocalist of The Jones Girls, who were a trio of sisters that had a number of hit singles in late 1970's and early 80's. Shirley went on to have a solo career after the group disbanded in 1984.

Career
Jones was born in Detroit, Michigan and began singing gospel as a child with her sisters, Brenda and Valorie, and her mother Mary Frazier Jones. Shirley and her sisters eventually began singing secular music as The Jones Girls, and signed their first recording contract with GM Records in 1970, releasing the single "My Own Special Way".

The Jones Girls became background singers for Diana Ross, Aretha Franklin, Teddy Pendergrass and others.

In 1979, Jones and her sisters signed a recording contract to Philadelphia International Records, and enjoyed a string of hit singles in the first half of the 1980s.

After the group disbanded in 1984, Jones was offered a solo contract with Philadelphia International Records, and released the hit single, "Do You Get Enough Love". The song spent 20 weeks on Billboard's R&B chart peaking at No. 1 on August 26, 1986.  A full-length album followed entitled, "Always In The Mood" which peaked at No. 8 on Billboard's R&B Album chart.

After the success of the single, Jones married Harlem Globetrotters basketball player Harold Hubbard.

Jones sister Valorie died on December 2, 2001, in Detroit, Michigan. She was 45. On April 3, 2017, Jones sister Brenda Jones, died at age 62 after being hit by several cars.

As of 2020, Jones resides in McDonough, Georgia and continues to tour around the country and overseas preserving the legacy of The Jones Girls.

Discography
With The Jones Girls

Solo
Albums
"Always in the Mood" (Philadelphia International Records, 1986) U.S. #128, U.S. R&B #8
"With You" (Diverse Records, 1994)

Singles
"Do You Get Enough Love" (1986) U.S. R&B #1
"Last Night I Needed Somebody" (1986) U.S. R&B #36
"She Knew About Me" (1987) U.S. R&B #80

References

20th-century American women singers
20th-century American singers
1953 births
Living people
Singers from Detroit
21st-century American women singers
21st-century American singers